The posterior cranial fossa is the part of the cranial cavity located between the foramen magnum, and tentorium cerebelli. It is formed by the  sphenoid bones, temporal bones, and occipital bone. It lodges the cerebellum, and parts of the brainstem.

Anatomy 
The posterior cranial fossa is formed by the sphenoid bones, temporal bones, and occipital bone. It is the most inferior of the fossae. It houses the cerebellum, medulla oblongata, and pons.

Boundaries 
Anteriorly, the posterior cranial fossa is bounded by the dorsum sellae, posterior aspect of the body of sphenoid bone, and the basilar part of occipital bone/clivus.

Laterally, it is bounded by the petrous parts and mastoid parts of the temporal bones, and the lateral parts of occipital bone.

Posteriorly, it is bounded by the squamous part of occipital bone.

Features

Foramen magnum 

The foramen magnum is a large opening of the floor of the posterior cranial fossa, its most conspicuous feature.

Internal acoustic meatus 

Lies in the anterior wall of the posterior cranial fossa. It transmits the facial (VII) and vestibulocochlear (VIII) cranial nerves into a canal in the petrous temporal bone.

Jugular foramen 

Lies between the inferior edge of the petrous temporal bone and the adjacent occipital bone and transmits the internal jugular vein (actually begins here), the glossopharyngeal nerve (CN IX), vagus nerve (CN X), and accessory nerve (CN XI).

Hypoglossal canal 

Lies at the anterolateral margins of the foramen magnum and transmits the hypoglossal nerve (CN XII).

Other
Also visible in the posterior cranial fossa are depressions caused by the venous sinuses returning blood from the brain to the venous circulation:
Right and left transverse sinuses which meet at the confluence of sinuses (marked by the internal occipital protuberance).

The transverse sinuses pass horizontally from the most posterior point of the occiput.

Where the apex of the petrous temporal meets the squamous temporal, the transverse sinuses lead into sigmoid (S-shaped) sinuses (one on each side).

These pass along the articulation between the posterior edge of the petrous temporal bone and the anterior edge of the occipital bones to the jugular foramen, where the sigmoid sinus becomes the internal jugular vein.

Note that a superior petrosal sinus enters the junction of the transverse and sigmoid sinuses. Also an inferior petrosal sinus enters the sigmoid sinus near the jugular foramen.

The posterior cranial fossa is formed in the endocranium, and holds the most basal parts of the brain.

Clinical significance
An underdeveloped posterior cranial fossa can cause Arnold–Chiari malformation.  These can be either acquired or congenital disorders.

Additional images

See also
 Anterior cranial fossa
 Middle cranial fossa

References

External links

 

Skull